Bacillus megaterium is a rod-like, Gram-positive, mainly aerobic spore forming bacterium found in widely diverse habitats. It has a cell length of up to 4 µm and a diameter of 1.5 µm, which is quite large for a bacteria. The cells often occur in pairs and chains, where the cells are joined together by polysaccharides on the cell walls.

In the 1960s, prior to the utilization of Bacillus subtilis for this purpose, B. megaterium was the main model organism among Gram-positive bacteria for intensive studies on biochemistry, sporulation and bacteriophages. Recently, its popularity has started increasing in the field of biotechnology for its recombinant protein production capacity.

This species has been recently transferred into the genus Priestia. The correct nomenclature is Priestia megaterium.

Characteristics

B. megaterium grows at temperatures from 3 °C to 45 °C, with the optimum around 30 °C. Some isolates from an Antarctic geothermal lake were found to grow at temperatures up to 63 °C. It has been recognized as an endophyte and is a potential agent for the biocontrol of plant diseases. Nitrogen fixation has been demonstrated in some strains of B. megaterium.

Bacillus megaterium has been an important industrial organism for decades. It produces penicillin amidase used to make synthetic penicillin and several enzymes, like amylases used in the baking industry and glucose dehydrogenase used in glucose blood tests. It also produces enzymes for modifying corticosteroids, as well as several amino acid dehydrogenases. Further, it is used for the production of pyruvate, vitamin B12 and molecules with fungicidal and antiviral properties. Several of these bioactive compounds are cyclic lipopeptides, belonging to the surfactin, iturin and fengycin lipopeptide families, which are also produced by several other Bacillus species.

Bacillus megaterium is known to produce poly-γ-glutamic acid. The accumulation of the polymer is greatly increased in a saline (2–10% NaCl) environment, in which the polymer comprises largely of L-glutamate (L-isomer content up to 95%). At least one strain of B. megaterium can be considered a halophile, as growth on up to 15% NaCl has been observed.

Phylogenetically, based on 16S rRNA, B. megaterium is strongly linked with B. flexus, the latter distinguished from B. megaterium a century ago, but only recently confirmed as a different species. B. megaterium has a complex plasmid content  as well as some phenotypic and phylogenetic similarities with pathogens B. anthracis and B. cereus, although itself being relatively harmless.

Isolation
Bacillus megaterium is ubiquitous in the environment around us. In addition to being a common soil bacterium and an endophyte, it can be found in various foods (including honey and bee pollen, in which most microorganisms do not grow) and on a variety of surfaces, including clinical specimens, leather, paper, stone etc.  It has also been isolated from cow feces, emperor moth caterpillars and greater wax moth frass.

The method of described in can be used to isolate strains of B. megaterium from the soil. The procedure starts with plating 0.1 ml of dilutions of heat-treated soil suspensions on glucose mineral base agar: 10g Glc; 1g (NH4)2SO4 or KNO3; 0.8g K2HPO4; 0.2g KH2PO4; 0.5g MgSO4·7H2O; 0.05g CaSO4·7H2O; 0.01g FeSO4·7H2O; 12g agar; distilled water to 1 litre; adjust pH 7.0. Plates are incubated at 30 °C. White, round, smooth and shiny colonies 1–3 mm in diameter may develop on the nitrate (KNO3) medium in 36–48 hours. However, not all strains can use nitrate, therefore the recommendation to use the ammonium ((NH4)2SO4) medium in parallel. Colonies are detected by their appearance and suspects should be observed microscopically for the typically large cells of this species.

History of the name
The species was described by de Bary in 1884, who called it Bacillus megaterium, but did not give an etymology. However, some subsequent authors called it B. megatherium assuming the name was incorrectly spelled. This trend continues as many scientists (mainly from the developing world) still use the name B. megatherium, sowing confusion.

The name B. megaterium is a nominative noun in apposition (see Rule 12 of IBCN) and is formed from the Greek adjective mega, (μέγας , μεγάλη, μέγα) meaning "great", and a second word of unclear etymology. Three hypotheses of the epithet "megaterium" are possible:
 unintentional orthographic error (unlikely given the fact that de Bary and his students, consistently used the epithet "megaterium"), whereas it should have been megatherium, from therion (θηρίον, meaning "beast"), to mean "great beast".
 a contraction of "megabacterium" as speculated by Rippel in given the fact that de Bary called the bacterium with the nickname Grosstier or Grossvich
 stems from teras, teratos (τέρας, τέρατος, a neuter noun meaning omen or wonder or, indirectly, monster,) which could be interpreted to mean "great monster" (with the Neolatin name being formed incorrectly given that there is no evidence of a Greek third declension noun when converted into Latin becoming a second Latin declension using the nominative stem, which is "ter-" while the other case use the stem "terat-". If were converted into a third declension noun it would have been "megateras, -atis").
Consequently, it was decided in the first juridical opinion of the Bacteriological code that the name should remain "megaterium" given the unclear meaning.

The etymology listed in LPSN is, despite being not quite correct, a fusion of the first and third interpretation Gr. adj. megas, large; Gr. n. teras -atis, monster, beast; N.L. n. megaterium, big beast.

The species name  has been applied to other genera.

References

External links
 Type strain of Bacillus megaterium at BacDive -  the Bacterial Diversity Metadatabase

megaterium
Bacteria described in 1884